Fleetwatch is a 1981 role-playing game adventure for Traveller published by Marischal Adventures.

Plot summary
Fleetwatch is the second in series of adventures focusing on the close escort ship the Stag, and takes place during the Fifth Frontier War.

Publication history
Fleetwatch was written by William H. Keith Jr. and was published in 1981 by Marischal Adventures as a 4-page pamphlet; a second edition was published in 1986 by Seeker.

Reception
William A. Barton reviewed Fleetwatch in The Space Gamer No. 47. Barton commented that "Fleetwatch, like Flight of the Stag, is an excellent Traveller offering."

Reviews
 Different Worlds #18 (Jan., 1982)

References

Role-playing game supplements introduced in 1981
Traveller (role-playing game) adventures